Anita Doreen Diggs (born 1966 in New York City) is an American editor, novelist, and lecturer.

Biography
Diggs grew up in New York City, where she attended public schools in the Hell's Kitchen section of Manhattan.

She later worked as a senior editor at Random House until 2002 and was a senior editor at Thunder's Mouth Press.

Diggs is the author of four novels:
A Mighty Love (2003)
A Meeting in the Ladies Room (2004)
The Other Side of the Game (2005)
Denzel’s Lips (2006)

She has written books on career advice and resources for African Americans. She teaches creative writing for Gotham Writers Workshop. She is also a writing mentor with the Creative Nonfiction mentoring program.

References

Faculty Profile, Gotham Writers Workshop.

21st-century American novelists
African-American novelists
Living people
1966 births
American editors
Writers from New York City
American women novelists
21st-century American women writers
Novelists from New York (state)
21st-century African-American women writers
21st-century African-American writers
20th-century African-American people
20th-century African-American women